In mathematics, Bertrand's postulate (actually now a theorem) states that for each  there is a prime  such that . First conjectured in 1845 by Joseph Bertrand, it was first proven by Chebyshev, and a shorter but also advanced proof was given by Ramanujan.

The following elementary proof was published by Paul Erdős in 1932, as one of his earliest mathematical publications. The basic idea is to show that the central binomial coefficients need to have a prime factor within the interval  in order to be large enough. This is achieved through analysis of the factorization of the central binomial coefficients.

The main steps of the proof are as follows. First, show that the contribution of every prime power factor  in the prime decomposition of the central binomial coefficient  is at most . Then show that every prime larger than  appears at most once.

The next step is to prove that  has no prime factors in the interval .

The argument given is valid for all . The remaining values of  are by direct inspection, which completes the proof.

Lemmas in the proof

The proof uses the following four lemmas to establish facts about the primes present in the central binomial coefficients.

Lemma 1
For any integer , we have

Proof: Applying the binomial theorem,

since  is the largest term in the sum in the right-hand side, and the sum has  terms (including the initial  outside the summation).

Lemma 2

For any prime , .

so

Therefore,

and

Lemma 3 

Lemma 4
An upper bound is supplied for the primorial function,

where the product is taken over all prime numbers  less than or equal to the real number .

For all real numbers , .

Proof:

The proof proceeds by complete induction on  
 If , then 
 If , then 
 If  is odd, then by the above estimate and the induction assumption, since  and   it is

 If  is even and  then by the above estimate and the induction assumption, since  and  it is
.

Only  is used in the proof.

Proof of Bertrand's Postulate
Assume that there is a counterexample: an integer n ≥ 2 such that there is no prime p  with n < p < 2n.

If 2 ≤ n < 468, then p can be chosen from among the prime numbers 3, 5, 7, 13, 23, 43, 83, 163, 317, 631 (each being the largest prime less than twice its predecessor) such that n < p < 2n.  Therefore, n ≥ 468.

There are no prime factors p of  such that:
 2n < p, because every factor must divide (2n)!;
 p = 2n, because 2n is not prime;
 n < p < 2n, because we assumed there is no such prime number;
 2n&hairsp;/&hairsp;3 < p ≤ n: by Lemma 3.
Therefore, every prime factor p satisfies p ≤ 2n&hairsp;/&hairsp;3.

When  the number  has at most one factor of p. Then, starting with Lemma 1 and decomposing the  side into its prime factorization, and finally using Lemma 4, these bounds give:

Taking logarithms yields to

By concavity of the right-hand side as a function of n, the last inequality is necessarily verified on an interval.

But these cases have already been settled, and we conclude that no counterexample to the postulate is possible.

Addendum to proof

Lemma 1 can be expressed as

References

External links
 Chebyshev's Theorem and Bertrand's Postulate (Leo Goldmakher): https://web.williams.edu/Mathematics/lg5/Chebyshev.pdf
 Proof of Bertrand’s Postulate (UW Math Circle): https://sites.math.washington.edu/~mathcircle/circle/2013-14/advanced/mc-13a-w10.pdf
 Proof in the Mizar system: http://mizar.org/version/current/html/nat_4.html#T56
 

Prime numbers
Factorial and binomial topics
Article proofs
Theorems about prime numbers